The Willoughby River is a tributary of the Barton River, flowing on , in the Orleans County, Vermont, United States.

This river flows to northwest, southwest and northwest, crossing the municipalities of Westmore, Vermont, Orleans and Brownington. Its course runs through forested areas, agricultural and urban.

Course
The Willoughby River rises on the northwest shore of Lake Willoughby (). The southern part of the lake is surrounded by the Willoughby State Forest. This natural park contains the Mount Pisgah, Mount Hor and Mount Bartlett.

From the mouth of the Lake Willoughby, the Willoughby River flows on  according to the following segments:
  to the northwest in the municipality of Westmore, Vermont until the Lord stream (from the South) which drains the "Stillwater Swamp" located at West of Lake Willoughby;
  to the northwest in the municipality of Brownington, Vermont until Brownington Branch (from the northeast);
  to the southwest, en traversant la limite de Orleans to the outlet of a lake (from the southeast);
  to the northwest in Orleans across a valley and a plain where the river marks the boundary from north of the village of Orleans, Vermont to its confluence.

Toponymy
The term "Willoughby" is a surname of English origin.

The English place name "Willoughby River" was made official October 29, 1980 to the GNIS.

See also

Orleans County, Vermont
List of rivers in Vermont

References

External links

 Vermont Agency of Natural Resources accessed on September 24, 2015.

Rivers of Vermont
Orleans County, Vermont